Henry Too Wesley (5 December 1877 – 18 June 1944) was a Liberian lawyer and politician who served as the country's 19th vice president from 1924 to 1928. A member of the Grebo ethnic group, Wesley was Liberia's first indigenous vice president.

He was born in Maryland County, Liberia, in 1877. He was a member of the Senate prior to being elected to the office of vice president. He was the second of three vice presidents to serve under Charles D. B. King.

References

Vice presidents of Liberia
1877 births
1944 deaths
True Whig Party politicians
Grebo people
Liberian lawyers
People from Maryland County
Members of the Senate of Liberia
20th-century Liberian lawyers
20th-century Liberian politicians